Creseidae is a family of gastropods belonging to the order Pteropoda.

Genera:
 Boasia Dall, 1889
 † Bovicornu Meyer, 1886
 † Bowdenatheca R. L. Collins, 1934 †
 † Bucanoides Hodgkinson, 1992 
 † Camptoceratops Wenz, 1923
 † Cheilospicata Hodgkinson, 1992
 Creseis Rang, 1828
 † Euchilotheca Fischer, 1882
 † Loxobidens Hodgkinson, 1992
 Styliola Gray, 1847
 † Thecopsella Munier-Chalmas, 1888
 Tibiella Meyer, 1884

References

 Rampal J. (1973). Phylogénie des Ptéropodes Thécosomes d'après la structure de la coquille et la morphologie du manteau. Comptes Rendus des Séances de l'Académie des Sciences de Paris. ser. D, 277: 1345–1348.
 Jensen, R. H. (1997). A Checklist and Bibliography of the Marine Molluscs of Bermuda. Unp. , 547 pp
 anssen A.W. (2003) Notes on the systematics, morphology and biostratigraphy of fossil holoplanktonic Mollusca, 13. Considerations on a subdivision of Thecosomata, with the emphasis on genus group classification of Limacinidae. Cainozoic Research 2(1-2): 163-170.
 Bouchet P., Rocroi J.P., Hausdorf B., Kaim A., Kano Y., Nützel A., Parkhaev P., Schrödl M. & Strong E.E. (2017). Revised classification, nomenclator and typification of gastropod and monoplacophoran families. Malacologia. 61(1-2): 1-526

External links
 Corse E., Rampal J., Cuoc C., Pech N., Perez Y. & Gilles A. (2013) Phylogenetic analysis of Thecosomata Blainville, 1824 (holoplanktonic Opisthobranchia) using morphological and molecular data. PLoS ONE 8(4): e59439

Pteropoda
Gastropod families